The 1997–98 British Collegiate American Football League season was the 13th full season of the BCAFL, organised by the British Students American Football Association (BSAFA, now the BAFA).

Changes from last season
Division Changes
There were no changes to the Divisional setup

Team Changes
Aston Rhinos withdrew after seven seasons
Cambridge Pythons withdrew after seven seasons
Hull Sharks moved within the Northern Conference from Central to Eastern Division
Paisley Panthers withdrew after eight seasons
Sheffield Zulus withdrew after eight seasons
This decreased the number of teams in BCAFL to 27.

Regular season

Northern Conference, Scottish Division

Northern Conference, Eastern Division

Northern Conference, Central Division

Southern Conference, Eastern Division

Southern Conference, Central Division

Southern Conference, Western Division

Playoffs

Note – the table does not indicate who played home or away in each fixture.

References

External links
 Official BUAFL Website
 Official BAFA Website

1997
1997 in British sport
1998 in British sport
1997 in American football
1998 in American football